The 2003 season of the Belgian Football League (BFL) is the regular season played in the Belgium. In the Belgian Bowl XVI, the Antwerp Diamonds were disqualified giving the title to the Brussels Black Angels.

Regular season

Regular Season overview
The FFL schedules two games at one location for saving on transportationcosts for referees and the costs of renting an ambulance and first aid responders. Half of the time, teams are playing virtually at home but actually play at the hosting team's homefield due to these costsaving measures. 
{| bgcolor="#f7f8ff" cellpadding="3" cellspacing="0" border="1" style="font-size: 90%; border: gray solid 1px; border-collapse: collapse;"
|- bgcolor="#CCCCCC"
!  style=background-color:yellow colspan=7 |FFL
|- bgcolor="#CCCCCC" 
!Week!! Date !! Visitors !! Results !! Home !! Game Site
|-width="23%"
| 1
| March 2
|
|
|
|
|-width="23%"
| 2
| March 9
| West Flanders Tribes
| align=center| 6 - 22| Antwerp Diamonds| Antwerp
|-width="23%"
| 3
| March 16
|
|
|
|
|-width="23%"
| 4
| March 23
| West Flanders Tribes
| align=center| 6 - 26| Flemalle Flames| Charleroi
|-width="23%"
| 5
| March 30
| Brussels Black Angels
| align=center| 14 - 20| West Flanders Tribes| Izeghem
|-width="23%"
| 6
| April 6
| West Flanders Tribes| align=center| 36 - 0| Liège Red Roosters
| Liège
|-width="23%"
| 7
| April 13
|
|
|
|
|-width="23%"
| 8
| April 20
| colspan="5" align="center"| Easter Bye
|-width="23%"
| 9
| April 27
| West Flanders Tribes
| align=center| 6 - 6'| Charleroi Cougars
| Charleroi
|-width="23%"
| 10
| May 4
|
|
|
|
|-
|}

Regular season standingsW = Wins, L = Losses, T = Ties, PCT = Winning Percentage, PF= Points For, PA = Points Against''

Post season

References

American football in Belgium
BFL
BFL